Krasimir Georgiev (born 23 April 1986) is a Bulgarian footballer who is currently playing for FC Slivnishki geroi as a forward.

External links
 Profile

Bulgarian footballers
1986 births
Living people
First Professional Football League (Bulgaria) players
PFC Litex Lovech players
PFC Vidima-Rakovski Sevlievo players
PFC Lokomotiv Mezdra players
OFC Vihren Sandanski players

Association football forwards